Joe Guy may refer to:
Joe Guy (cricketer) (1813–1873), English cricketer
Joe Guy (musician) (1920–1962), American jazz trumpeter